HSAB concept is a jargon for "hard and soft (Lewis) acids and bases".  HSAB is widely used in chemistry for explaining stability of compounds, reaction mechanisms and pathways. It assigns the terms 'hard' or 'soft', and 'acid' or 'base' to chemical species. 'Hard' applies to species which are small, have high charge states (the charge criterion applies mainly to acids, to a lesser extent to bases), and are weakly polarizable. 'Soft' applies to species which are big, have low charge states and are strongly polarizable.

The theory is used in contexts where a qualitative, rather than quantitative, description would help in understanding the predominant factors which drive chemical properties and reactions. This is especially so in transition metal chemistry, where numerous experiments have been done to determine the relative ordering of ligands and transition metal ions in terms of their hardness and softness.

HSAB theory is also useful in predicting the products of metathesis reactions. In 2005 it was shown that even the sensitivity and performance of explosive materials can be explained on basis of HSAB theory.

Ralph Pearson introduced the HSAB principle in the early 1960s as an attempt to unify inorganic and organic reaction chemistry.

Theory 

Essentially, the theory states that soft acids react faster and form stronger bonds with soft bases, whereas hard acids react faster and form stronger bonds with hard bases, all other factors being equal. The classification in the original work was mostly based on equilibrium constants for reaction of two Lewis bases competing for a Lewis acid.

Borderline cases are also identified: borderline acids are trimethylborane, sulfur dioxide and ferrous Fe2+, cobalt Co2+ caesium Cs+ and lead Pb2+ cations. Borderline bases are: aniline, pyridine, nitrogen N2 and the azide, chloride, bromide, nitrate and sulfate anions.

Generally speaking, acids and bases interact and the most stable interactions are hard–hard (ionogenic character) and soft–soft (covalent character).

An attempt to quantify the 'softness' of a base consists in determining the equilibrium constant for the following equilibrium:

BH + CH3Hg+  H+ + CH3HgB

Where CH3Hg+ (methylmercury ion) is a very soft acid and H+ (proton) is a hard acid, which compete for B (the base to be classified).

Some examples illustrating the effectiveness of the theory:
 Bulk metals are soft acids and are poisoned by soft bases such as phosphines and sulfides.
 Hard solvents such as hydrogen fluoride, water and the protic solvents tend to dissolve strong solute bases such as fluoride and oxide anions. On the other hand, dipolar aprotic solvents such as dimethyl sulfoxide and acetone are soft solvents with a preference for solvating large anions and soft bases.
 In coordination chemistry soft–soft and hard–hard interactions exist between ligands and metal centers.

Chemical hardness 

In 1983 Pearson together with Robert Parr extended the qualitative HSAB theory with a quantitative definition of the chemical hardness (η) as being proportional to the second derivative of the total energy of a chemical system with respect to changes in the number of electrons at a fixed nuclear environment:

.

The factor of one-half is arbitrary and often dropped as Pearson has noted.

An operational definition for the chemical hardness is obtained by applying a three-point finite difference approximation to the second derivative:

where I is the ionization potential and  A the electron affinity. This expression implies that the chemical hardness is proportional to the band gap of a chemical system, when a gap exists.

The first derivative of the energy with respect to the number of electrons is equal to the chemical potential, μ, of the system,

,

from which an operational definition for the chemical potential is obtained from a finite difference approximation to the first order derivative as

which is equal to the negative of the electronegativity (χ) definition on the Mulliken scale: μ = −χ.

The hardness and Mulliken electronegativity are related as

,

and in this sense hardness is a measure for resistance to deformation or change. Likewise a value of zero denotes maximum softness, where softness is defined as the reciprocal of hardness.

In a compilation of hardness values only that of the hydride anion deviates. Another discrepancy noted in the original 1983 article are the apparent higher hardness of Tl3+ compared to Tl+.

Modifications 
If the interaction between acid and base in solution results in an equilibrium mixture the strength of the interaction can be quantified in terms of an equilibrium constant. An alternative quantitative measure is the heat (enthalpy) of formation of the Lewis acid-base adduct in a non-coordinating solvent. The ECW model is quantitative model that describes and predicts the strength of Lewis acid base interactions, -ΔH  . The model assigned E and C parameters to many Lewis acids and bases. Each acid is characterized by an EA and a CA. Each base is likewise characterized by its own EB and CB. The E and C parameters refer, respectively, to the electrostatic and covalent contributions to the strength of the bonds that the acid and base will form. The equation is

-ΔH  =  EAEB  +  CACB  +  W

The W term represents a constant energy contribution for acid–base reaction such as the cleavage of a dimeric acid or base.  The equation predicts reversal of acids and base strengths. The graphical presentations of the equation show that there is no single order of Lewis base strengths or Lewis acid strengths. The ECW model accommodates the failure of single parameter descriptions of acid-base interactions.

A related method adopting the E and C formalism of Drago and co-workers quantitatively predicts the formation constants for complexes of many metal ions plus the proton with a wide range of unidentate Lewis acids in aqueous solution, and also offered insights into factors governing HSAB behavior in solution.

Another quantitative system has been proposed, in which Lewis acid strength toward Lewis base fluoride is based on gas-phase affinity for fluoride. Additional one-parameter base strength scales have been presented. However, it has been shown that to define the order of Lewis base strength (or Lewis acid strength) at least two properties must be considered.  For Pearson's qualitative HSAB theory the two properties are hardness and strength  while for Drago’s quantitative ECW model the two properties are electrostatic and covalent .

Kornblum's rule 
An application of HSAB theory is the so-called Kornblum's rule (after Nathan Kornblum) which states that in reactions with ambident nucleophiles (nucleophiles that can attack from two or more places), the more electronegative atom reacts when the reaction mechanism is SN1 and the less electronegative one in a SN2 reaction. This rule (established in 1954) predates HSAB theory but in HSAB terms its explanation is that in a SN1 reaction the carbocation (a hard acid) reacts with a hard base (high electronegativity) and that in a SN2 reaction tetravalent carbon (a soft acid) reacts with soft bases.

According to findings, electrophilic alkylations at free CN− occur preferentially at carbon, regardless of whether the SN1 or SN2 mechanism is involved and whether hard or soft electrophiles are employed. Preferred N attack, as postulated for hard electrophiles by the HSAB principle, could not be observed with any alkylating agent. Isocyano compounds are only formed with highly reactive electrophiles that react without an activation barrier because the diffusion limit is approached. It is claimed that the knowledge of absolute rate constants and not of the hardness of the reaction partners is needed to predict the outcome of alkylations of the cyanide ion.

Criticism 
Reanalysis of a large number of various most typical ambident organic system reveals that thermodynamic/kinetic control describes reactivity of organic compounds perfectly, whereas the HSAB principle fails and should be abandoned in the rationalization of ambident reactivity of organic compounds.

See also 
Acid-base reaction
Oxophilicity

References 

Acid–base chemistry
Inorganic chemistry